The Kreis Schams forms, together with the sub-districts of Avers, Domleschg, Rheinwald and Thusis, the  ("district") Hinterrhein of the Canton Graubünden in Switzerland.  The district office is located in Zillis-Reischen.

Geography 
Geographically, the Kreis is equivalent to the Schams valley, the middle section of the Hinterrhein valley south of the Viamala gorge.

External links

 Official website of the Kreis Schams
 

Districts of Graubünden